Southern Lehigh School District is a public school district located in Lehigh County, Pennsylvania. It serves the borough of Coopersburg and Lower Milford and Upper Saucon townships in the Lehigh Valley region of eastern Pennsylvania.

Students in ninth through 12th grade attend the district's high school, Southern Lehigh High School in Center Valley. Southern Lehigh Middle School serves 7th and 8th graders. The district's intermediate school for fourth through sixth grades, Joseph P. Liberati Intermediate School, opened in 2009. The district has two elementary schools serving kindergarten through third grades, Hopewell and Liberty Bell.

As of the 2021-22 school year, the district had 3,101 students across its five schools, according to National Center for Education Statistics.

Schools
Southern Lehigh High School
Southern Lehigh Middle School
Joseph P Liberati Intermediate School
Hopewell Elementary School
Liberty Bell Elementary School

References

External links
Official website

School districts in Lehigh County, Pennsylvania